Haemodracon trachyrhinus is a species of lizard in the family Phyllodactylidae. It is endemic to Socotra. They are active at night and live mainly in rocky habitats.

References

Haemodracon
Lizards of Africa
Endemic fauna of Socotra
Taxa named by George Albert Boulenger
Reptiles described in 1899